Trevor Dave Rhone (24 March 1940 – 15 September 2009) was a Jamaican writer, playwright and film maker. He co-wrote, with director Perry Henzell, the internationally successful film The Harder They Come (1972).

Life 
Trevor Rhone, was the last child of twenty-three, grew up in the tiny town of Bellas Gate in Saint Catherine, Jamaica. After seeing his first play at the age of nine he fell in love with theatre.  Educated at Beckford & Smith High School now known as the St. Jago High School, He began his theatre career as a teacher after a three-year stint at Rose Bruford College, an English drama school, where he studied in the early 1960s on scholarship. He was part of the renaissance of Jamaican theatre in the early 1970s. Rhone participated in a group called Theatre '77, which established The Barn, a small theatre in Kingston, Jamaica, to stage local performances. The vision of the group that came together in 1965 was that in 12 years, by 1977 there would be professional theatre in Jamaica.

His prolific work includes the films The Harder They Come (1972), co-author; Smile Orange (1974), based on his play of the same name; Top Rankin'''; Milk and Honey (1988), winner; One Love (2003), Cannes Film Festival favorite.

He was awarded the Musgrave Gold Medal in 1999 for his work by the Institute of Jamaica.

 Death 
Trevor D. Rhone died on 15 September 2009 of a massive heart attack, and was buried in Bellas Gate, St. Catherine, Jamaica.

 Works 

 Publications of plays 

 It's Not My Fault Baby (1967), co-author
 The Gadget (1968)
 Cinderella (1969), musical
 Music Boy (1971)
 Sleeper (1972)
 Comic Strip (1973)                               
 Everyman (1980)
 Old Story Time (1981) - new 2010 Longman edition includes CSEC-specific study notes 
 Two Can Play (1982)
 The Game (1985)Family Planning Musical (1989)All in One (1991)The Power (1992), commissioned by BBC RadioOne Stop Driver (1992)Dear Counselor (1997)
 Bellas Gate Boy (c2002), an autobiography, earned the Actor Boy Award for "Best New Play" c2002.

 Films 
 The Harder They Come (1972), co-author.
 Smile Orange (1974), based on his play of the same name.Top Rankin'  Milk and Honey (1988), Toronto Festival of Festivals and Genie Award winner.
 One Love'' (2003), Cannes Film Festival favourite.

Honours 
 Commander of the Order of Distinction.
 Focus of the Caribbean Cultural Theatre's film festival in New York in March 2006.
 Fellow of Rose Bruford College theatre school.
 Jamaica Gleaner Honour Award for contributions to the arts (2007).
 Gold Musgrave Medal, 1988

For a more complete list see Awards and Honours.

References

External links 

Theatre in Jamaica
Trevor Rhone Official Website
trevorrhoneartistspage on Facebook
"′Harder They Come′ writer looks back", Doug Miller, BobMarley.com, 28 March 2007.

1940 births
2009 deaths
Jamaican dramatists and playwrights
Jamaican male writers
Male dramatists and playwrights
Alumni of Rose Bruford College
Commanders of the Order of Distinction
Best Screenplay Genie and Canadian Screen Award winners
Recipients of the Musgrave Medal
20th-century dramatists and playwrights
20th-century male writers
20th-century screenwriters